is a Japanese politician who served in the House of Representatives between 1972 and 2012, and as Minister of Health, Labour and Welfare from 2001 to 2004.

Early life 
He was born in Mie Prefecture and obtained an MD from Mie University. After qualifying as a physician, he worked at the Mie Red Cross Blood Center.

Political career 
He first ran for the House of Representatives as a member of Komeitō in the 1972 general election, and won a seat representing Mie Prefecture.

Sakaguchi was Minister of Labor in the 1993-94 coalition cabinet led by Morihiro Hosokawa. After the coalition government collapsed, he was the second-ranking officer of three other political parties, New Frontier Party (1994), Shintō Heiwa (1997), and New Komeito Party (1999).

Mori and Koizumi Cabinet positions 
In December 2000, he was appointed Minister of Health and Welfare and Minister of Labor in the LDP-Liberal-Komeito coalition cabinet of Yoshirō Mori. The ministries merged in 2001, making Sakaguchi the first individual to hold the combined position of Minister of Health, Labour and Welfare. He retained this position under Junichiro Koizumi until September 2004.

As Health and Welfare Minister, Sakaguchi delivered an apology to Hansen's disease patients who were subjected to forced sterilization under the former Japanese eugenics protection law. He later advocated in the Diet for compensating the victims of these practices, and described them as "an egregious violation of human rights."

Following Japan's first BSE outbreak in 2001, Sakaguchi introduced testing of all slaughtered cattle in Japan, which continued through the last year of his tenure. He also dealt with record unemployment rates, and oversaw the implementation of reforms to the employment insurance and pension system. He was described by the Japan Institute for Labour Policy and Training as "one of the busiest of all the ministers" during this time.

Retirement 
Sakaguchi retired from the House of Representatives prior to the 2012 general election due to a party rule that forbade support for candidates over the age of 66. He thereafter became a special advisor to the New Komeito Party.

References 

1934 births
Living people
Politicians from Mie Prefecture
Ministers of Health, Labour and Welfare of Japan
20th-century Japanese physicians
Members of the House of Representatives (Japan)
Komeito politicians
New Komeito politicians
New Frontier Party (Japan) politicians
20th-century Japanese politicians
21st-century Japanese politicians